Thermonotus is a genus of longhorn beetles of the subfamily Lamiinae, containing the following species:

 Thermonotus apicalis Ritsema, 1881
 Thermonotus cylindricus Aurivillius, 1911
 Thermonotus nigripennis Ritsema, 1896
 Thermonotus nigripes Gahan, 1888
 Thermonotus nigriventris Breuning, 1959
 Thermonotus pasteuri Ritsema, 1890
 Thermonotus ruber (Pic, 1923)
 Thermonotus rufipes Breuning, 1958

References

Lamiini